Nargesi Kebab, Nargisi Kofta or Nargis Shami Kebab is an Indian and Middle Eastern dish originating in Lucknow, Uttar Pradesh during the Mughal period and is a kind of kebab or kofta with a chicken egg in the middle. It is named after Narcissus flower because when kebabs are cut they look like the flower's petals. To cook Nargesi Kebab, you wrap a mixture of minced meat, usually beef, diced onions and chopped peppers, spiced with paprika and onion powder, around a boiled egg, its fried in ghee or butter and eaten alongside tzatziki, curry, or other sauces.

See also 
 Nargesi (food)
 Scotch egg

References 

Indian cuisine
Kebabs
Egg dishes
Ground meat